Mi Lu Bing is the first album by Singapore band Mi Lu Bing. Their debut album shares a name with their band.
After eleven months of anticipation, their self-titled debut album was finally released on 9 July 2007. It has since sold over 6,000 copies in Singapore. They penned three of the songs, namely 泪 (Tears), 适应 (Getting Adjusted), Get Alive. And these became the top 3 hit singles of their album and 泪 was also nominated for best composer during the Singapore Hit Awards 2007.  百万宝, written by Zhang LeShengfrom Project Superstar 2, was the theme song for Mediacorp drama 百万宝.

Track listing 
 泪
 适应
 Get Alive
 天使眷恋
 我为什么还爱你
 So Sad
 适应 (Acoustic 版)
  百万宝
 勇气

Songs on music charts

Mi Lu Bing albums
2007 albums